Rune Gerhardsen (13 June 1946 – 4 September 2021) was a Norwegian politician, representing the Norwegian Labour Party, and sports leader at Norwegian Skating Association representing Aktiv SK.

Biography
Gerhardsen was a son of Werna and Einar Gerhardsen, and attended Oslo Cathedral School. He chaired the Workers' Youth League from 1973 to 1975 and served as Oslo’s governing mayor from 1992 to 1997.

He chaired the Norwegian Skating Association from 1986 to 1990, again from 2001 to 2003 and for a third time from 2013 to 2017.

Gerhardsen died on 4 September 2021 at Nordseterhjemmet in Oslo, surrounded by his closest family.

Personal life
Gerhardsen was married to Tove Strand in 1968 (divorced in 1996) and they had two daughters, Marte and Mina.

Selected works

References

External links

1946 births
2021 deaths
Politicians from Oslo
Labour Party (Norway) politicians
Norwegian sports executives and administrators
People educated at Oslo Cathedral School